The 2020 Alabama Crimson Tide baseball team will represent the University of Alabama in the 2020 NCAA Division I baseball season. The Crimson Tide will play their home games at Sewell–Thomas Stadium.

Previous season

The Crimson Tide finished 30–26 overall, and 7–23 in the conference.

SEC media poll
The SEC media poll was released on February 6, 2020 with the Crimson Tide predicted to finish in last place in the Western Division.

Personnel

Roster

Coaching staff

Schedule and results

Schedule Source:
*Rankings are based on the team's current  ranking in the D1Baseball poll.

2020 MLB Draft

References

Alabama
Alabama Crimson Tide baseball seasons
Alabama Crimson Tide baseball